Carbon, or Carbon-Lang, is an experimental, general-purpose programming language. The project is open-source and was started by Google, following in the footsteps of previous Google-made programming languages (Go and Dart). Google engineer Chandler Carruth first introduced Carbon at the CppNorth conference in Toronto in July 2022. He stated that Carbon was created to be a C++ successor. The language is expected to have a 1.0 release in 2024 or 2025.

The language intends to fix several perceived shortcomings of C++ but otherwise provides a similar feature set.
The main goals of the language are readability and "bi-directional interoperability", as opposed to using a new language like Rust (which, while being influenced by C++, is not two-way compatible with C++ programs). Changes to the language will be decided by the Carbon leads.

Carbon's documents, design, implementation, and related tools are hosted on GitHub under the Apache-2.0 license with LLVM Exception.

Example
The following shows how a "Hello, World!" program is written in Carbon:

package Sample api;

fn Main() -> i32 {
    var s: auto = "Hello, World!";
    Print(s);
    return 0;
}
The following is the equivalent "Hello, World!" program written in C++:
#include <iostream>

int main() {
    auto s = "Hello, World!";
    std::cout << s;
    return 0;
}

See also

 Comparison of programming languages
 Timeline of programming languages
 C++
 D
 Rust

References

External links 
 
 Carbon at the Compiler Explorer (godbolt)

Google
Programming languages
Statically typed programming languages
Cross-platform software
Object-oriented programming languages